Dent du Chat (cat's tooth) is a mountain of Savoie, France. It lies in the Jura range.

Mountains of Savoie